José Miguel Parra (born November 28, 1972) is a former Major League Baseball right-handed pitcher who played from -. He most recently served as the pitching coach for the Gulf Coast League Tigers.

Playing career
As of the end of the 2017 season, Parra is the only player in Major League Baseball history to have 4 or more career plate appearances as a batter, but have no official at bats.  In Parra's 4 career plate appearances, he recorded 2 sacrifice hits (both in 1 game in 1995, Dodgers vs. Rockies), and 2 walks (both in 1 game in 2000, Pirates vs. Braves).

Coaching career
On December 13, 2018, Parra was named pitching coach for the Gulf Coast League Tigers. He previously served as the pitching coach for the Dominican Summer League Tigers for 11 seasons. On September 15, 2019, Parra was fired by the Tigers.

References

External links

1972 births
Águilas Cibaeñas players
Albuquerque Dukes players
Arizona Diamondbacks players
Bakersfield Dodgers players
Binghamton Mets players
Cafeteros de Córdoba players
Diablos Rojos del México players
Dominican Republic expatriate baseball players in Japan
Dominican Republic expatriate baseball players in Mexico
Dominican Republic expatriate baseball players in South Korea
Dominican Republic expatriate baseball players in Taiwan
Dominican Republic expatriate baseball players in the United States
Great Falls Dodgers players
Guerreros de Oaxaca players
Gulf Coast Dodgers players
Hanwha Eagles players
KBO League pitchers

Living people
Los Angeles Dodgers players
Major League Baseball pitchers
Major League Baseball players from the Dominican Republic
Mexican League baseball pitchers
Minnesota Twins players
Nashville Sounds players
New York Mets players
Nippon Professional Baseball pitchers
Norfolk Tides players
Orix Buffaloes players
Pittsburgh Pirates players
Salt Lake Buzz players
Samsung Lions players
San Antonio Missions players
Tucson Sidewinders players
Uni-President Lions players
Yomiuri Giants players